Owens Peak is the highest point in the southern Sierra Nevada, at more than  above sea level. The eastern watershed of Owens Peak is composed of three main canyons: Grapevine Canyon, Short Canyon, and Indian Wells Canyon (north to south, respectively). The Sierra Nevada meets the Great Basin and the Mojave Desert here, creating an unusual ecosystem.

History
Owens Peak is named after Richard Owens (1812–1902), an Ohio-born explorer (aka "Owings"), who accompanied John C. Frémont on his third expedition to California (1845–1846). Frémontalso named a valley, river and lake for Owens, whom he considered "cool, brave and of good judgment". Owens served as a captain in Frémont's California Battalion during the Mexican–American War and was California's Secretary of State during Frémont's brief tenure as governor (1847).

See also
 Owens Peak Wilderness

References

Mojave Desert
Mountains of Kern County, California
Mountains of Southern California